Harriet Purvis Jr. also known as Hattie Purvis (1839 – 1904) was an African-American abolitionist, suffragist and a member of the temperance movement. She was part of the second generation of American suffragists. Purvis worked closely with Susan B. Anthony.

Biography 
She was born in 1839 to activists Harriet Forten Purvis and Robert Purvis. She was the granddaughter of James Forten. She grew up in a household that was center of the Pennsylvania's Underground Railroad. She attended school at Friends Eagleswood School and Theodore Dwight Weld's Raritan Bay Union school in Perth Amboy, New Jersey.

She was a member of the Philadelphia Female Anti-Slavery Society and worked to raise funds. She attended the 1866 National Woman's Rights Convention and became a member of the American Equal Rights Association (AERA). She served as secretary for AERA from 1866 until 1869. She was on the executive committee of the Pennsylvania Woman's Suffrage Association. She was a delegate and the first African-American president of the National Woman's Suffrage Association.

She died on April 4, 1904, in Watertown, Massachusetts.

References 

1839 births
1904 deaths
African-American abolitionists
African-American suffragists
American suffragists
American temperance activists
Activists from Philadelphia
Colored Conventions people
Underground Railroad people
Forten family
20th-century African-American people
20th-century African-American women